Edmund Parker may refer to:

 Ed Parker (Edmund Kealoha Parker, 1931–1990), American martial artist, promoter, teacher, and author
 Ed Parker Jr. (Edmund Kealoha Parker, born 1959),American martial arts practitioner and artist
 Edmund Parker, 2nd Earl of Morley (1810–1864), British peer and Whig politician
 Edmund Parker, 4th Earl of Morley (1877–1905), British peer and Devon landowner
 Edmund Parker Jr. House, historic house in Winchester, Massachusetts

See also
 Albert Parker, 3rd Earl of Morley (Albert Edmund Parker, 1843–1905), British peer politician